Will Butt (born 15 January 2000) is an English professional rugby union player for Bath Rugby.

Early life
Butt started playing age group rugby for Bath at 14. He studied at Canford School before captaining Bath under-18s and representing the University of Bath.

Career
In April 2021 Butt joined Coventry of the RFU Championship on loan. During that loan spell he equalled a Coventry club record 4 tries in a single game against the Jersey Reds in May 2021. Butt started training regularly with the senior Bath squad in the summer of 2021. He made his Rugby Premiership debut in December 2021 against Northampton Saints at Franklin's Gardens. On 11 November, 2022 Butt scored a last minute try to secure for Bath a 19-18 win over Leicester Tigers at The Rec.

References

2000 births
Living people
English rugby union players
Bath Rugby players
Rugby union centres
Alumni of the University of Bath